Albornoz is a Spanish surname. Notable people with the surname include:

 Gil Álvarez Carrillo de Albornoz (–1367), Spanish cardinal and archbishop
 Rodrigo de Albornoz (fl. 1520s), Spanish colonial official in Mexico
 Gil Carrillo de Albornoz (1579–1649) (1579–1649), Spanish cardinal
 José Carrillo de Albornoz, 1st Duke of Montemar (1671–1747), Spanish nobleman
 Álvaro de Albornoz (1879–1954), Spanish writer and politician
 Claudio Sánchez-Albornoz y Menduiña (1893–1984), Spanish medieval historian
 Humberto Albornoz (1894–1959), Ecuadorian politician
 Severo Ochoa de Albornoz (1905–1993), Spanish-American physician
 Aurora de Albornoz (1926–1990), Spanish poet
 José Albornoz (born 1970), Argentine footballer
 Oscar Javier Morales Albornoz (born 1975), Uruguayan footballer
 Juan José Albornoz (born 1982), Chilean footballer
 Mauricio Albornoz (born 1988), Swedish footballer
 Miiko Albornoz (born 1990), Chilean footballer
 Camilo Albornoz (born 2000), Argentine footballer

Spanish-language surnames